The Tripolitania expedition or the Oea expedition was a battle in 523 between various nomadic Berber ("Moor") confederations of Tripolitania led by Cabaon which previously seized lots of territory from, and raided several settlements of the Vandal Kingdom, and king Thrasamund of the Vandals who was attempting to restore Vandalic control over the territories lost to the advancing Berber tribes. The battle ended in a decisive Berber victory, and a complete collapse of Vandalic control over much of Tripolitania.

Background 
Starting at the Vandal conquest of Roman Africa, the Vandals seized much of Northwest Africa still under Western Roman rule, and established the Vandal Kingdom in 435. They soon enough came into conflict with the native Berber population of the region, although initially under Gaiseric's rule Berber rebellions from inside, and nomadic Berber attacks from the deserts were mostly defeated and the Vandals held a solid grip over the region. However, this changed after Gaiseric's death in 477, and soon enough various Christian and Pagan Berber states and tribes began expanding at the expense of the Vandalic Kingdom. The Vandals first lost control over the west of their kingdom to the Kingdom of Altava, and then lost control over the Aurés to the locals in 484. Meanwhile in modern day Libya powerful nomadic Berber confederations such as the Laguatan began migrating mainly oasis to oasis from Cyrenaica to the region of Tripolitania and came into increased conflict with the local Vandalic garrisons. In the 510s the Laguatans and other Berber tribes allied to them seized much of the area of Tripolitania ranging from the Nafusa Mountains to the coast, and established a kingdom there. After this, the Tripolitanian Berbers began raiding the area of Byzacena, or the heartland of the Vandal Kingdom, which was already unstable after losing the regions of Dorsale and Capsa to other Berbers. In 523 then Vandalic king Thrasamund wanted to restore control over the territories lost in Byzacena, and to pacify Tripolitania, and decided to start his military campaigns by attacking the Laguatan then led by Cabaon.

Procopius's description of the battle

Aftermath 
The Vandals were severely weakened after the battle, and their control over Tripolitania was permanently weakened beyond relief until their collapse in 533 during the Vandalic War.

References 

520s conflicts
Battles involving the Vandals
Vandalic War
Vandal Kingdom
Vandal warriors
History of Libya
Military history of Libya
6th century in Africa